The 2018–19 season was Falkirk's sixth consecutive season in the Scottish Championship and their eighth consecutive season in the second-tier of Scottish football. Falkirk also competed in the League Cup, Challenge Cup and the Scottish Cup. Falkirk finished the season in tenth place and were relegated to the third-tier of Scottish football for only the second time in their history.

Summary

Management
Falkirk began the 2018–19 season under the management of Paul Hartley who had guided the club to safety from relegation in his previous season. On 27 August, Hartley left his position as manager following a poor start to the season. Ray McKinnon was appointed as his replacement on 31 August but he could not prevent the club from being relegated. Falkirk's relegation was confirmed on the final day of the season despite winning their final match against league winners Ross County.

Results and fixtures

Pre Season

Scottish Championship

Scottish League Cup

Group stage
Results

Scottish Challenge Cup

Scottish Cup

Player statistics

|-
|colspan="12"|Players who left the club during the 2018–19 season
|-

|}

Club statistics

League table

Division summary

Transfers

Players in

Players out

Loans in

Loans out

See also
List of Falkirk F.C. seasons

References

Falkirk
Falkirk F.C. seasons